Qarabulaq may refer to:

 Qarabolaq, Wakhan District, Badakhshan Province, Afghanistan
 Qarabulaq, Almaty, Kazakhstan
 Gömür, Davachi, Azerbaijan
Qarabulaq, Gadabay, Azerbaijan
 Qarabulaq, Gobustan, Azerbaijan
Qarabulaq, Goygol, Azerbaijan
 Qarabulaq, Khizi, Azerbaijan
 Qarabulaq, Khojali, Azerbaijan
 Qarabulaq, Oghuz, Azerbaijan
 Qarabulaq, Quba, Azerbaijan
 Qarabulaq, Shusha, Azerbaijan
 Qarabulaq, East Azerbaijan, Iran
 Qarabulaq, Zanjan, Iran
 Qarabulaq, Abhar, Zanjan Province, Iran

See also
Karabulak (disambiguation)
Qarah Bolagh (disambiguation)